Mountain of Dinosaurs or Dinosaurs Hill is a 1967 Soviet animated film directed by Rasa Strautmane and produced by the Soyuzmultfilm studio in Moscow.

Plot 
The story follows the lives of dinosaurs as they fall in love and have children, their eggs hatched by the hot sun as their parents look on. As the weather begins to cool, the shells begin to thicken, refusing to let the dinosaur babies leave, eventually resulting in their extinction.

Legacy 
The film is generally interpreted as a subversive commentary on the dangers of the authoritarian state.

The film is one of the older of the forty-five animated Soviet-era shorts in the four-DVD collection "Masters of Russian Animation" collection (1997), which Soyuzmultfilm released in conjunction with Films by Jove.

See also 
History of Russian animation

References

External links 
 Dinosaurs Hill at the Animator.ru

 
 with English subtitles

1967 films
Russian animated short films
Soviet animated films
Soyuzmultfilm
Fictional dinosaurs
1967 animated films
1967 short films